Harvey Brownstone (born July 24, 1956) is a retired  judge of the Ontario Court of Justice and the first openly gay judge in Canada. He is also a bestselling author and host of a television and internet talk show.

Early life and education
Brownstone was born on July 24, 1956, in Paris, France, and was raised in Hamilton, Ontario. His father, Sam Brownstone, was the director of the Hamilton Jewish Community Centre for many years, and his mother, Odette Brownstone, owned "Odette de Paris", a highly successful French ladies' wear business. He attended Adelaide Hoodless Elementary School and Scott Park Secondary School and received his LL.B. degree from Queen's University in Kingston, Ontario in 1980 and was called to the Bar of Ontario in 1983 after articling with criminal lawyers Leo Adler and William A. Gorewich.

Career
Brownstone worked as a Legal Aid duty counsel lawyer in the Toronto criminal courts from 1983 to 1985, and then practised criminal law with prominent criminal lawyers William A. Gorewich (now a judge of the Ontario Court of Justice) and Stephen Price.

In 1987 he joined the Research Facility of the Ontario Legal Aid Plan, where he became head of the Family Law section. In 1989 he joined the Ministry of the Attorney General, Support and Custody Enforcement Branch, as counsel. The Support and Custody Enforcement Program was responsible for the enforcement of child and spousal support orders and custody orders. In 1991 he was appointed legal director of the Family Support Plan (which was the new name of the Support and Custody Enforcement Program), and in 1992 he was appointed director of the entire program while continuing to serve as legal director. He was instrumental in the creation and implementation of two important support enforcement tools: support deduction orders (commonly referred to as "automatic wage deduction") and the suspension of defaulting support payors' drivers licences, making Ontario the first jurisdiction in Canada to introduce these highly effective support enforcement mechanisms. The Program is now called the Family Responsibility Office, and is operated by the Ministry of Community and Social Services.

Brownstone served on the Toronto Mayor's Committee on Community and Race Relations from 1990 to 1993, and chaired the first Subcommittee on Gay Issues. This appointment was featured as the cover story in the October 11, 1991 issue of Xtra Magazine.

Brownstone was appointed a judge of the Ontario Court of Justice on March 13, 1995, making him the first openly gay judge in Canada. Brownstone has presided in both criminal court and family court. He served as Local Administrative Judge of the Toronto Metro West Family Court from 1999 to 2001 and then served as Local Administrative Judge of the Toronto North Family Court from 2001 to 2006. During his tenure as Local Administrative Judge, he coordinated the mergers of the Toronto Metro West (80 The East Mall) and Metro East (1911 Eglinton Avenue East) Family Courts with the Metro North Family Court at 47 Sheppard Avenue East, making the Metro North Court the biggest and busiest provincial Family Court in Ontario. In 2006 Justice Brownstone was instrumental in persuading the Court Services Division of the Ministry of the Attorney General to hire a full-time staff mediator at the newly merged Family Court. In December 2013, Justice Brownstone began presiding exclusively in the criminal court in Ontario.  He adjudicated several high-profile cases.

Justice Brownstone was on the Board of Directors of the Ontario Family Law Judges Association from 1995 to 1999, and on the Board of Directors of the Ontario Conference of Judges from 1999 to 2002. He was a member of the Ontario Family Rules Committee from 1991 to 1994 and again from 1999 to 2011.

Having been born in France and raised by a French-speaking mother and an English-speaking father, Justice Brownstone is fluently bilingual.  From April 4, 1995 until October 15, 2018, he was the only Provincial Judge in the Toronto Region who heard Family Court cases in both English and French.

In 1997 Justice Brownstone gave a groundbreaking speech at the University of Toronto Faculty of Law, decrying the plight of the thousands of self-represented litigants appearing in Family Court, and urging the Law School and legal community to provide services to these vulnerable clients. This speech inspired the creation of Pro Bono Students Canada's Family Law Project, which now provides invaluable assistance to self-represented litigants in Family Courts throughout Canada. Justice Brownstone is featured in a widely distributed promotional video celebrating the important work done by Pro Bono Students Canada. Justice Brownstone is regularly called upon to speak at events organized by Pro Bono Students Canada and is considered an important spokesperson and ally for Pro Bono Student programs at law schools throughout Canada. Through his support of the Pro Bono Students Canada Family Law Project, Justice Brownstone is an "ambassador" in the Flip Your Wig campaign, which raises public awareness about the importance of enhancing access to justice. On May 13, 2016 Justice Brownstone was presented with a Pro Bono Students Canada Supporter Award at the organization's 20th-anniversary gala dinner held at the Law Society of Upper Canada's Convocation Hall.

In 2008 Justice Brownstone was awarded "Best Behind-the-Scenes Champion" by the readers of Xtra Magazine.

On June 14, 2008, at New York City Hall, Justice Brownstone was presented with a Proclamation signed by New York State Senator Thomas Duane, in recognition of Brownstone's role in having officiated at hundreds of same-sex weddings for New York citizens who travelled to Toronto to get married. This event was held to commemorate the fifth anniversary of the legalization of same-sex marriage in Canada.

In August 2010 Justice Brownstone received the prestigious "Colleague in the Spotlight" award from the Canadian Bar Association Judges' Forum.  In 2011, Brownstone contributed a chapter highlighting Ontario's case management system in a book entitled "Innovations for Self-Represented Litigants" published in the United States by the Association of Family and Conciliation Courts.
His commentary on the flaws in the family justice system have prompted reforms by the Attorney General, who has enacted many of the changes suggested by Brownstone. Despite this, in 2015 Justice Brownstone was inexplicably overlooked for the position of Chief Justice of the Ontario Court of Justice notwithstanding his strong administrative background prior to being appointed to the Bench, his working knowledge of both criminal and family courts, his being bilingual, and his reputation for being "an approachable innovator".  In a media article published December 23, 2022, Brownstone, now fully retired from the judiciary, spoke publicly about the process he endured during the Chief Justice recruitment, referring to it as "a fiasco". 

Justice Brownstone retired from the judiciary in December 2021 so that he could devote his full attention to his online talk show, Harvey Brownstone Interviews. A lengthy retrospective feature article highlighting his career and internet talk show was published in numerous newspapers following his retirement from the judiciary.  

On June 20, 2022, he made his third appearance on "The Agenda With Steve Paikin", discussing his life, judicial career and the success of his online talk show, "Harvey Brownstone Interviews".  As a retired judge, no longer constrained by the restrictions imposed on sitting judges to refrain from expressing personal opinions, Brownstone has expressed strong views criticizing the family and criminal justice systems.

Justice Brownstone is the recipient of a Distinguished Alumni Award from Queen's University Faculty of Law.

In 2022, multi-platinum Grammy nominated recording artist Harriet Schock composed a song entitled, "I Am Yours", inspired by Brownstone's struggles to gain parental acceptance after coming out to them at the age of 19.  The song has been recorded by Gary Lynn Floyd and released as a single.

Media
Although as a rule judges almost never speak publicly about the work they do, or make themselves available to the media, Justice Brownstone was a notable exception. His charisma and use of humour has made him one of the most recognizable faces of the Canadian justice system. Brownstone's public persona and frequent media appearances has led to him being described as "a pioneer that is unilaterally changing the public image of the judiciary." He is one of the most sought-after speakers at universities and legal conferences because he is "innovative and always highly relevant". He has been described as "a judge who speaks passionately about divorce, families and the impact on society without hesitation. Educating the public about divorce, and other family matters seems to be his mission." His most recent interview on CBC's "Out in the Open" went viral on the internet. He is highly respected within the LGBT community because he was the first openly gay judge appointed in Canada, and is frequently called upon to speak at events within that community. In October 2020, Justice Brownstone hosted a 5-part podcast series entitled Examination in Chief, which examines the ways in which the criminal justice system impacts people in the LGBTQ community.

In 2021, Brownstone launched his own internet talk show entitled "Harvey Brownstone Interviews", consisting of a YouTube channel, website and podcast channel featuring interviews with celebrities and authors.  He frequently appears as a guest on popular podcasts.

Tug of War
In addition to his role in the court, Brownstone frequently comments on family law and divorce issues in the Canadian national media. Brownstone has published a best-selling book, Tug of War, on family law and divorce. The book was the first of its kind, written by a sitting judge on legal issues and intended for the general public. The book was highly acclaimed and received widespread support from leading members of Canada's legal and judicial community. Madame Justice Claire L'Heureux-Dube (retired) of the Supreme Court of Canada provided an endorsement on the book's cover, stating "This is a thoughtful, heartfelt book with a generous touch of wisdom, providing tremendous insight into the impact and consequences of family court litigation." The book contains forwards by Chief Justice Tedford G. Andrews (retired) of the Ontario Provincial Court (Family Division) [now the Ontario Court of Justice], and by Justice James D. Karswick of the Ontario Court of Justice, and by Judge Paula J. Hepner, Supervising Judge of the New York State Family Court.  The book is frequently quoted in media articles about Family Law and high-profile child custody cases.

The impact of Tug of War has extended far beyond the boundaries of Canada. Justice Brownstone's message—that high conflict parents need not only legal advice, but counselling to overcome the emotional trauma of separation—has resonated with lawyers, jurists and academics in other countries. Many law school academics in other countries, such as the United Kingdom, now advocate for multidisciplinary training in social work and mediation in addition to law degrees, and cite Tug of War in support of this approach.

Justice Brownstone's royalties from the book go directly to the Children's Wish Foundation of Canada.

Family Matters
In 2010, Brownstone hosted an online talk show entitled Family Matters with Justice Harvey Brownstone which was the first talk show ever hosted by a sitting Canadian judge. Eight episodes were produced for online viewing and made available for free through iTunes and on the show's website. Those episodes dealt with: child support; when do children need lawyers; collaborative law; elder abuse; mediation; how to manage your lawyer; child protection; and prenups. In 2011 Family Matters began broadcasting as a television show. Fifteen episodes of the show debuted on CHCH TV on September 13, 2011 and were also broadcast on a number of other independent Canadian TV stations in addition to being available free online. Those episodes dealt with the following topics: Parental Alienation; Marriage Confidential; Parenting Coordination; The Smart Divorce; Divorce with Dignity; Fairway Divorce; A View From the Bench (featuring retired Alberta Judge Michael Porter); Domestic Violence (featuring B.C. Judge Gary Cohen); Access (featuring B.C. Judge Jane Cartwright); Grandparents' Rights; Sexual Addictions; Men's Issues in Family Law; Pets and Divorce; Remarriage; and Online Security and Privacy. Family Matters was renewed for a second season which was filmed in February 2013 in Toronto, Ontario and Victoria, British Columbia. Season 2 made its debut on Canadian television on May 4, 2013 on CHEK TV and CHCH TV featuring 16 episodes addressing the following topics: gambling addictions (featuring Ontario Justice Victoria Starr when she was a lawyer before being appointed to the Bench); infidelity; online dating; bullying; same-sex parenting; the impact of high conflict on children's learning at school; high conflict divorce; child abduction; an introduction to family court (featuring Ontario Justice Robert Spence); spousal support (featuring Ontario Justice Stanley Sherr); anger management; parenting of teenagers; wills and estates; family financing; and breaking up. Season 2 also features a Question and Answer segment in which Vancouver lawyer Lorne MacLean, QC answers questions submitted by viewers to AdviceScene.com. All episodes of Family Matters continue to be available for viewing at no charge on the "Family Matters TV" YouTube channel. Justice Brownstone donated all of his time for free, paid for his own travel and hotel accommodations, and earned no remuneration for his participation in this program.

In 2020, Justice Brownstone reactivated his media presence by returning to broadcast television and online streaming programming as a legal resource and interviewer.

Edie & Thea: A Very Long Engagement and Justice Brownstone's role in the same-sex marriage movement
Brownstone officiated at the marriage of Edith Windsor and Thea Spyer, whose marriage triggered the constitutional litigation at the United States Supreme Court regarding same-sex marriage (United States v. Windsor). He has spoken publicly and written about the role he played in officiating at this monumentally important wedding. In Edith Windsor's autobiography, published posthumously, she writes about the impact of having Justice Brownstone officiate at her wedding. Justice Brownstone was featured in the critically acclaimed documentary Edie & Thea: A Very Long Engagement (Bless Bless Productions, 2010), and is the subject of a full-length interview on the special features on the DVD. As Canada's first openly gay judge, he has been recognized for playing an instrumental role in raising Canada's profile in the evolution of marriage equality law in the United States. On August 9, 2013 he received the "Hero of the Week Award" from the Social Justice for All website.
In addition, Justice Brownstone was prominently featured in the globally distributed promotional video celebrating World Pride, held in Toronto from June 21 to 29, 2014. Edith Windsor, at age 85, made a return trip to Toronto to celebrate World Pride, and was cited by Justice Brownstone as "the Rosa Parks of the gay rights movement". Justice Brownstone and Edith Windsor made a much-anticipated and historic appearance together on CTV's Canada AM and gave a joint presentation at the World Pride International Human Rights Conference on June 25, 2014.
Justice Brownstone has written a brief memoir reflecting on his experiences as Canada's first openly gay judge and his role in the legal evolution of same-sex marriage in Chapter 1 (pages 26 – 28) of LGBTQ2+ Law: Practice Issues and Analysis (Joanna Radbord, Emond Publishing, 2019).

Awards
1974 Max Rotman Humanitarian Youth Award

2002: Queen Elizabeth II Golden Jubilee Medal

2008: Best Behind the Scenes Champion, Xtra Magazine

June 14, 2008: Proclamation from New York State Senate in recognition of having officiated at the weddings of hundreds of same-sex weddings for citizens of New York.

2010: Colleague in the Spotlight Award, Canadian Bar Association Judges' Forum

August 9, 2013: Hero of the Week Award from Social Justice for All

May 13, 2016: Pro Bono Students Canada Supporter Award

May 31, 2016: Recipient of the "Justice Thomas Cromwell Distinguished Public Service Award" from Queen's University Faculty of Law

Published works
 Tug of War: A Judge's Verdict on Separation, Custody Battles and the Bitter Realities of Family Court (ECW Press, 2009).
 "The Homosexual Parent in Custody Disputes", Queen's Law Journal, Volume 5, Number 2

References

External links 

 
 49 minute audio.
 

LGBT judges
Living people
Judges in Ontario
Queen's University at Kingston alumni
Writers from Hamilton, Ontario
Writers from Paris
1956 births
Canadian gay writers
LGBT Jews
Queen's University Faculty of Law alumni